Marquis Xi may refer to:

Marquis Xi of Jin (died 823 BC)
Marquis Xi of Cai (died 761 BC)

See also
Marquis Li (disambiguation)
Duke Xi (disambiguation)